Clear Creek is a stream in southern Iowa and northwestern Missouri. It is a tributary of the Nodaway River.

The stream flows through the southeast corner of Page County, Iowa and enters Nodaway County, Missouri.

The stream flows to the southwest for approximately six miles and then turns to the west southeast of the community of Clearmont. Clear Creek crosses under US Route 71 one half mile south of Clearmont and enters the Nodaway two miles west of Route 71 just to the east of the community of Possum Walk.

The stream was named due to its clear waters.

References

Rivers of Nodaway County, Missouri
Rivers of Page County, Iowa
Rivers of Taylor County, Iowa